Margaret L. Drugovich is an American academic administrator and healthcare policy researcher who served as the 10th president of Hartwick College July 1, 2008 through July 31, 2022.

Early life and education 
Drugovich grew up on her parents' grape farm in Geneva, Ohio. First in her family to attend college, she studied experimental psychology at Albertus Magnus College, graduating in 1981, and later earned a master's in medical sociology at Brown University. Drugovich completed a Doctor of Management at the Weatherhead School of Management in 2004, where she was a Fellow at the Mandel Center for Nonprofit Organizations. In 2015, Albertus Magnus College named Drugovich its Outstanding Alumna of the Year.

Career 
Drugovich worked as a healthcare policy researcher at the Brown University Center for Gerontology and Health Care Research. 
 She joined Bryant University as associate director for institutional research, was named executive assistant to the president by Dr. William Truehart, and then Bryant's dean of admission and financial aid. In 1998, Drugovich joined Ohio Wesleyan University as vice-president for strategic communication and university enrollment.

In February 2008, Drugovich was announced as the 10th president of Hartwick College, in Oneonta, New York; she took office on July 1. She soon developed the Organizing Principle & Strategic Framework that guided college decision making throughout her tenure. Major planning initiatives followed, including a master facilities plan (2012), the Leadership Group (2013–14), the Hartwick225 Action Plan in anticipation of Hartwick's 225th year (2017–18), and the COVID-responsive Strategic Response Team (2020).

Early priorities of her tenure addressed college affordability. In 2009, Hartwick launched a three-year degree program in which ambitious students can earn a degree in the majority of majors offered, taking three-quarters the time and at three-quarters the cost. In 2010, quiet fundraising began for The Campaign for Hartwick Students: It's Personal. The initiative raised $43.7 million with student scholarships as the principal objective.

Drugovich led innovative forays into developing alternative revenue streams to support the educational enterprise. The first among them - the Hartwick College Center for Craft Food & Beverage - was launched in 2014 with support from the Empire State Development Corporation, the Appalachian Regional Commission, the Alden Trust, Brewery Ommegang, and State Senator James Seward. The Center for Craft Food & Beverage (CCFB) supports small brewers across the region and the country with affordable testing services in product quality and improvement; students gain professional experience as research assistants and interns.

Following collegewide budget cuts in 2016, the Hartwick faculty passed a motion of no confidence in the president that April. The following month the Board of Trustees announced she had accepted their offer of a new eight-year contract as president.

Drugovich served as the chair of the American Council on Education(ACE) Women's Network Executive Council, and was a member of the NCAA Division III President's Council and Strategic Planning and Finance Committee. She also served as a member of the board of the National Association of Independent Colleges and Universities (NAICU), and was chair of the executive committee on Accountability. Drugovich was also board treasurer and chair of the Finance and Administrative Committee of the New York Commission on Independent Colleges and Universities (CICU).

On September 13, 2021, Margaret Drugovich announced that she would be stepping down as president of Hartwick College in the summer of 2022.

Personal life 
Drugovich is openly gay and one of the first out LGBTQ presidents in higher education in the US. She and her long-term partner, Elizabeth Steele, married in 2013; they have two children together.

References

Heads of universities and colleges in the United States
Women heads of universities and colleges
People from Geneva, Ohio
Hartwick College faculty
Lesbian academics
LGBT people from Ohio
Case Western Reserve University alumni
Albertus Magnus College alumni
Brown University alumni
Ohio Wesleyan University faculty
Bryant University alumni
American academic administrators
Living people
Year of birth missing (living people)